Abu Zayd Abd al-Rahman al-Jazuli al-Tamanarti al-Mghafri (died 1070 AH, 1659/60 AD) was a qadi of the Moroccan town Taroudannt and grand qadi of the Sous area. He is the author of  Fawaid al Jamma bi Isnadi Ouloumi al Oumma, an autobiographical work of great historical value that also includes biographies of his instructors. Appended to this work is a chapter about dreams, "Bab al-rabi".

References

17th-century Moroccan historians
Moroccan autobiographers
17th-century Moroccan judges
People from Taroudannt
1660 deaths
Year of birth unknown